SM UB-102 was a German Type UB III submarine or U-boat in the German Imperial Navy during World War I. She was commissioned into the German Imperial Navy on 17 October 1918 as SM UB-102.

 
UB-102 was surrendered to Italy on 22 November 1918 and broken up in La Spezia in July 1919.

Construction

She was built by AG Vulcan of Hamburg and following just under a year of construction, launched at Hamburg on 13 September 1918. UB-102 was commissioned later the same year . Like all Type UB III submarines, UB-102 carried 10 torpedoes and was armed with a  deck gun. UB-102 had a displacement of  while surfaced and  when submerged. Her engines enabled her to travel at  when surfaced and  when submerged.

References

Notes

Citations

Bibliography 

 

German Type UB III submarines
World War I submarines of Germany
U-boats commissioned in 1918
1918 ships
Ships built in Hamburg